Tomáš Poznar (born 27 September 1988) is a Czech professional footballer who plays as a forward for Bruk-Bet Termalica Nieciecza.

Career
He came to Trnava on loan in September 2013.

References

External links 
 
 
 

1988 births
Living people
Sportspeople from Zlín
Czech footballers
Czech Republic international footballers
Association football forwards
Czech First League players
Slovak Super Liga players
Ekstraklasa players
FC Fastav Zlín players
MFK Vítkovice players
FC Spartak Trnava players
FC Viktoria Plzeň players
FC Baník Ostrava players
Bruk-Bet Termalica Nieciecza players
Czech expatriate footballers
Expatriate footballers in Slovakia
Czech expatriate sportspeople in Slovakia
Expatriate footballers in Poland
Czech expatriate sportspeople in Poland